Smokey Bear is an American campaign and advertising icon of the U.S. Forest Service. In the Wildfire Prevention Campaign, which is the longest-running public service announcement campaign in United States history, the Ad Council, the United States Forest Service (USFS), and the National Association of State Foresters (NASF), in partnership with creative agency FCB, employ Smokey Bear to educate the public about the dangers of unplanned human-caused wildfires.

A campaign began in 1944 featuring Smokey and the slogan "Smokey Says – Care Will Prevent 9 out of 10 Forest Fires". His slogan changed to "Remember... Only YOU Can Prevent Forest Fires" in 1947 and was associated with Smokey Bear for more than five decades. In April 2001, the message was officially updated to "Only You Can Prevent Wildfires" in response to a massive outbreak of wildfires in natural areas other than forests (such as grasslands), and to clarify that Smokey was promoting the prevention of unplanned outdoor fires, not prescribed burns. Smokey has also had other lines throughout the years, but these have remained his central slogans. According to the Ad Council, 80% of outdoor recreationists correctly identified Smokey Bear's image and 8 in 10 recognized the campaign PSAs.

Smokey Bear's name and image are protected by the Smokey Bear Act of 1952 (16 U.S.C. 580 (p-2); previously also 18 U.S.C. 711). Smokey's name has always intentionally been spelled differently from the adjective "smoky".

Campaign beginnings

Although the U.S. Forest Service fought wildfires long before World War II, the war brought a new importance and urgency to the effort. At the time, many experienced firefighters and other able-bodied men were serving in the armed forces, leaving fewer at home to fight forest fires. The Forest Service began using colorful posters to educate Americans about the dangers of forest fires in the hope that local communities could prevent them from starting in the first place. Careless citizens were not the only fire threat though, as the Empire of Japan considered wildfires a possible weapon. During the spring of 1942, Japanese submarines surfaced near the coast of Santa Barbara, California, and fired shells that exploded on an oil field very close to Los Padres National Forest. U.S. planners hoped that if Americans knew how wildfires would harm the war effort, they would work with the Forest Service to eliminate the threat. The Japanese military renewed their wildfire strategy later in the war, launching some 9,000 fire balloons into the jet stream, with an estimated 11% reaching the U.S. between November 1944 and April 1945. In the end the balloon bombs caused a total of six fatalities: the wife of Archie E. Mitchell, Elsie, and five children were killed by one near Bly, Oregon, on May 5, 1945. A memorial was erected at what since has been named the Mitchell Monument Historic Site.

In 1942, the U.S. Forest Service established the Cooperative Forest Fire Prevention (CFFP) program. The same year, on August 13, Disney's full-length animated motion picture Bambi premiered in New York City. Soon after, Walt Disney allowed his characters to appear in fire prevention public service campaigns. However, Bambi was only loaned to the government for a year, so a new symbol was needed. After much discussion, a bear was chosen based on a rough sketch by Forest Service artist Harry Rossoll. His name was inspired by "Smokey" Joe Martin, a New York City Fire Department hero who suffered burns and blindness during a bold 1922 rescue.

On August 9, 1944, the creation of Smokey Bear was authorized by the Forest Service (this date is considered the character's birthday), and the first poster was delivered on October 10 by artist Albert Staehle. In the first poster, overseen by the Cooperative Forest Fire Prevention Campaign (CFFP), Smokey was depicted wearing jeans and a campaign hat, pouring a bucket of water on a campfire. The message underneath read, "Smokey says – Care will prevent 9 out of 10 forest fires!"

In 1947, the Wartime Advertising Council (later the Ad Council) coined the slogan now associated with Smokey Bear for more than five decades: "Remember ... only YOU can prevent forest fires." In 2001, the slogan was officially amended to replace "forest fires" with "wildfires" in response to a massive outbreak of wildfires in natural areas other than forests, and to clarify that the campaign was advocating the prevention of unplanned fires, not controlled burns or prescribed fires for conservation purposes.

Living symbol

The living symbol of Smokey Bear was a five-pound, three-month old American black bear cub who was found in the spring of 1950 after the Capitan Gap fire, a wildfire that burned in the Capitan Mountains of New Mexico. Smokey had climbed a tree to escape the blaze, but his paws and hind legs had been burned. Local crews who had come from New Mexico and Texas to fight the blaze removed the cub from the tree.

At first he was called Hotfoot Teddy, but he was later renamed Smokey, after the icon. New Mexico Department of Game and Fish Ranger Ray Bell heard about the cub and took him to Santa Fe, where he, his wife Ruth, and their children Don and Judy cared for the little bear with the help of local veterinarian Dr Edwin J. Smith. The story was picked up by the national news services and Smokey became a celebrity. Many people wrote and called asking about the cub's recovery. The state game warden wrote to the chief of the Forest Service, offering to present the cub to the agency as long as the cub would be dedicated to a conservation and wildfire prevention publicity program. According to the New York Times obituary for Homer C. Pickens, then assistant director of the New Mexico Department of Game and Fish, he kept the cub on his property for a while before flying with the bear to D.C. Soon after, Smokey was flown in a Piper PA-12 Super Cruiser airplane to the National Zoo in Washington, D.C. A special room was prepared for him at the Saint Louis Zoo for an overnight fuel stop during the trip, and when he arrived at the National Zoo, several hundred spectators, including members of the Boy Scouts, Girl Scouts, photographers, and media, were there to welcome him.

Smokey Bear lived at the National Zoo for 26 years. During that time he received millions of visitors and many letters addressed to him (more than 13,000 a week) that in 1964 the United States Postal Service gave him his own ZIP Code (20252), which is still in use. He developed a love for peanut butter sandwiches, in addition to his daily diet of bluefish and trout.

In 1962, Smokey was paired with a female bear, "Goldie Bear," with the hope that perhaps Smokey's descendants would take over the Smokey Bear title. In 1971, when the pair still had not produced any young, the zoo added "Little Smokey," another orphaned bear cub from the Lincoln Forest, to their cage—announcing that the pair had "adopted" this cub.

On May 2, 1975, Smokey Bear officially "retired" from his role as living icon, and the title "Smokey Bear II" was bestowed upon Little Smokey in an official ceremony. Little Smokey died August 11, 1990.

Upon the death of the original bear on November 9, 1976, his remains were returned by the government to Capitan, New Mexico, and buried at Smokey Bear Historical Park, operated by the New Mexico State Forestry Division. The facility is now a wildfire and Smokey interpretive center. The bear is interred in the adjacent garden. The plaque at his grave reads, "This is the resting place of the first living Smokey Bear ... the living symbol of wildfire prevention and wildlife conservation."

The Washington Post ran a semi-humorous obituary for Smokey, labeled "Bear," calling him a transplanted New Mexico native who had resided for many years in Washington, D.C., with many years of government service. It also mentioned his family, including his wife, Goldie Bear, and "adopted son" Little Smokey. The obituary noted that Smokey and Goldie were not blood-relatives, despite the fact that they shared the same "last name" of "Bear." The Wall Street Journal included an obituary for Smokey Bear on the front page of the paper on November 11, 1976. The New York Times published one as well; in fact, so many newspapers published articles and obituaries that the National Zoo archives include four complete scrapbooks devoted to them (Series 12, boxes 66–67).

Popularity

Smokey quickly became a part of American popular culture, appearing on radio programs, in comic strips, in cartoons, and as merchandise. Knickerbocker Bears acquired the license to produce Smokey Bear dolls in 1944. In 1949, Forest Service worker Rudy Wendelin became the campaign's full-time artist and was considered Smokey Bear's "manager" until Wendelin retired in 1973.

By 1952, Smokey Bear had attracted considerable commercial interest, so the United States Congress passed the Smokey Bear Act to remove the character from the public domain and place it under the control of the Secretary of Agriculture. The act provided for the use of Smokey's royalties for continued education on the subject of forest wildfire prevention.

A Smokey Bear doll was produced by Ideal Toys beginning in 1952; the doll included a mail-in card for children to become Junior Forest Rangers. Children could also apply by writing the U.S. Forest Service or Smokey Bear at his ZIP Code. Within three years half a million children had applied. Also in 1952, songwriters Steve Nelson and Jack Rollins had a successful song named "Smokey the Bear" which was performed by Eddy Arnold. The pair said "the" was added to Smokey's name to keep the song's rhythm. During the 1950s, that variant of the name became widespread both in popular speech and in print, including at least one standard encyclopedia, despite Smokey Bear's name never officially changing. A 1955 book in the Little Golden Books series was called Smokey the Bear and he calls himself by this name in the book. It depicted him as an orphaned cub rescued in the aftermath of a forest fire, loosely following the true story of the bear chosen as Smokey's "living symbol". This was the first book about him, and it was followed by many sequels and coloring books. Soon, thousands of dolls, toys, and other collectibles were on the market.

During the 1950s and 1960s, the Ad Council sponsored radio advertisements featuring Smokey Bear "in conversation" with prominent American celebrities such as Bing Crosby, Art Linkletter, Dinah Shore and Roy Rogers. Smokey's name and image are used for the Smokey Bear Awards, which are awarded by the U.S. Forest Service, the National Association of State Foresters (NASF) and the Ad Council, to "recognize outstanding service in the prevention of human-caused wildfires and to increase public recognition and awareness of the need for continuing fire prevention efforts".

In 1959, a 14-foot tall animatronic version of Smokey Bear was unveiled at the Ohio State Fairgrounds in Columbus, OH. at the Ohio Department of Natural Resources (ODNR) Natural Resources Park. It was installed to help teach fire prevention to children and their families. Then, in 2015, it was replaced by a new Smokey Bear version in the same location. Both iterations of the animatronic figure have asked visitors to take the pledge to "never, ever play with matches or leave any fire unattended".

The Beach Boys even quote Smokey Bear in their 1964 song "Drive-In": "If you say you watch the movie you're a couple of liars / and 'Remember only you can prevent forest fires'". Though Smokey was originally drawn wearing the campaign hat of the U.S. Forest Service, the hat itself later became famous by association with the Smokey cartoon character. Today, it is sometimes called a "Smokey Bear hat" and is still used by the U.S. Forest Service, some branches of the military, and the state police.

Legacy

For Smokey's 40th anniversary in 1984, he was honored with a U.S. postage stamp, illustrated by Rudy Wendelin, that pictured a cub hanging onto a burned tree. The same year, the U.S. Forest Service began to transfer Smokey Bear materials that had been collected from the CFFP campaign to the National Agricultural Library to be maintained in their Special Collections as documentation of the program. The National Archives and Records Administration (NARA) transferred their materials concerning Smokey to the NAL's special collections in 1990. The NAL continues to accept and maintain donations from various Forest Service offices. The collection consists of posters, proofs, mechanicals, original artwork, motion pictures, sound recordings, and various pieces of memorabilia, some of which are available online; all the pieces are accessible in Beltsville, MD, through the library.

The commercial for his 50th anniversary portrayed woodland animals about to have a surprise birthday party for Smokey, including a cake with candles. Smokey comes blindfolded, smells smoke and not realizing the source is his birthday candles, he uses his shovel to destroy the cake. When he takes off his blindfold, he sees that it was a birthday cake for him and apologizes. That same year, a poster of the bear with a cake full of extinguished candles was issued. It reads "Make Smokey's Birthday Wish Come True".

In 2004, Smokey's 60th anniversary was celebrated in several ways, including a Senate resolution designating August 9, 2004, as "Smokey Bear's 60th Anniversary", requesting that the President issue a proclamation "calling upon the people of the United States to observe the day with appropriate ceremonies and activities". According to Richard Earle, author of The Art of Cause Marketing, the Smokey Bear campaign is among the most powerful and enduring of all public service advertising:"Smokey is simple, strong, straightforward. He's a denizen of those woods you're visiting, and he cares about preserving them. Anyone who grew up watching Bambi realizes how terrifying a forest fire can be. But Smokey wouldn't run away. Smokey's strong. He'll stay and fight the fire if necessary, but he'd rather have you douse it and cover it up so he doesn't have to."On the anniversary of finding Smokey Bear in the Capitan Gap fire, Marianne Gould from the Smokey Bear Ranger District, Eddie Tudor from the Smokey Bear Museum and Neal Jones from the local Ruidoso, New Mexico, radio station created "Smokey Bear Days" starting in 2004. The event celebrates the fire prevention message from the Smokey Bear campaign as well as wilderness and environmental conservation with music concerts, chainsaw carving contests, a firefighter's "muster" competition, food, vendors and a parade. The "Smokey Bear Days" celebration is held in Smokey's hometown of Capitan, New Mexico, the first weekend of May every year.

Between 2008 and 2011, new public service announcements (PSAs) featuring Smokey rendered in CGI were released. In 2010, the PSAs encouraged young adults to "Get Your Smokey On" – that is, to become like Smokey and speak up appropriately when others are acting carelessly. In 2011, the campaign launched its first mobile application, or app, to provide critical information about wildfire prevention, including a step-by-step guide to safely building and extinguishing campfires, as well as a map of current wildfires across America.

In 2012, NASA, the U.S. Forest Service, the Texas Forest Service and Smokey Bear teamed up to celebrate Smokey's 68th birthday at NASA's Johnson Space Center in Houston. The popular mascot toured the center and recorded a promotional announcement for NASA Television. NASA astronaut Joe Acaba and the Expedition 31 crew chose a plush Smokey doll to be the team's launch mascot, celebrating their trip to the International Space Station. During his tour about 250 miles above Earth, Smokey turned 68 years old.

In 2014, the campaign celebrated Smokey's 70th birthday, with new birthday-themed television, radio, print, outdoor, and digital PSAs that continued the 2013 campaign "Smokey Bear Hug". The campaign depicted Smokey rewarding his followers with a hug, in acknowledgement of using the proper actions to prevent wildfires. In return, outdoor–loving individuals across the nation were shown reciprocating with a birthday bear hug in honor of his 70 years of service. Audiences were encouraged to join in by posting their own #SmokeyBearHug online. The campaign also did a partnership with Disney's Planes that same year. In 2016, the campaign launched a new series of PSAs that aimed to increase awareness about less commonly known ways that wildfires can start. The new "Rise from the Ashes" campaign featured art by Bill Fink, who used wildfire ashes as an artistic medium to illustrate the devastation caused by wildfires and highlight less obvious wildfire causes. In 2017, the campaign launched new videos and artwork inspired by Smokey Bear posters to continue to raise awareness of lesser-known wildfire starts. The new artwork was created by Brian Edward Miller, Evan Hecox, Janna Mattia, and Victoria Ying, portraying Smokey Bear in each of their unique styles.

For his 75th birthday in 2019, the Smithsonian's National Zoo in Washington D.C. opened an outdoor exhibit on May 23, 2019. Fourteen posters and multiple archival photographs of the original bear line the pathway in front of Smokey Bear's original habitat. At the entrance stands a 6-foot-tall statue of his cartoon persona. Along with the exhibit, new commercials and promotional materials were released, and events were held throughout the U.S. The NAL showcased movies, commercials, and paintings at their Beltsville location, materials were loaned to government agencies, and materials were provided to travel to various National Forests across the country throughout 2019.

On August 1, 2019, Oregon Department of Motor Vehicles released a Smokey Bear License Plate, just a few days before Smokey Bear's 75th birthday. The plate was sponsored by Keep Oregon Green, and costs an extra $40 per registration period, $35 of which goes to Keep Oregon Green.

Voices
Washington, D.C., radio station WMAL personality Jackson Weaver served as the primary voice representing Smokey until Weaver's death in October 1992. Dallas McKennon voiced Smokey in the 1957 Woody Woodpecker short film, Red Riding Hoodlum. George Walsh briefly provided Smokey's voice in the mid 1960s. From 1969 to 1986, Smokey was voiced by Roger C. Carmel. After Weaver's death, Gene Moss took over the role and voiced him until his death in 2002. In later years, Smokey has also been voiced by Jim Cummings (1993–2006) and Jack Angel (2002–2012). Frank Welker also briefly voiced Smokey in a few commercials. In June 2008, the Forest Service launched a new series of public service announcements voiced by actor Sam Elliott, simultaneously giving Smokey a new visual design intended to appeal to young adults. (coincidentally, Elliott was born on the very same day that Smokey was created)

Adaptations

Smokey Bear—and parodies of the character—have been appearing in animation for more than fifty years. In 1956, he made a cameo appearance in the Walt Disney short film In the Bag with a voice provided by Jackson Weaver. Rankin/Bass Productions, in cooperation with Tadahito Mochinaga's MOM Production in Japan, produced an "Animagic" stop-motion animated television special, Ballad of Smokey the Bear, narrated by James Cagney. It aired on Thanksgiving Day, November 24, 1966, as part of the General Electric Fantasy Hour on NBC. The same day, a Smokey Bear balloon was featured in the Macy's Thanksgiving Day Parade, and it was advertised as "Thanksgiving is Smokey Bear Day on NBC TV".

During the 1969–1970 television season, Rankin/Bass also produced a weekly Saturday Morning cartoon series for ABC, called The Smokey Bear Show. This series was animated by Toei Animation in Japan.

Despite his real name being Smokey Bear, the name "Smokey the Bear" has been perpetuated in popular culture. Steve Nelson and Jack Rollins's song "Smokey the Bear" has been covered by the group Canned Heat, among others. The track is on their CD The Boogie House Tapes 1969–1999.

The online battle royale game Fortnite: Battle Royale parodies Smokey and his motto in a loading screen featuring Cuddle Team Leader, a woman dressed in a teddy bear costume replacing Smokey and doing his signature finger-pointing pose. Below her is the message "Only YOU can prevent V-Buck scams", warning players not to risk security compromises by attempting to obtain free virtual currency offered by hackers as bait.

Fire ecology

Although the goal of reducing human-caused wildfires has never changed, the tagline of the Smokey Bear campaign was adjusted in the 2000s, from "Only you can prevent forest fires" to "Only you can prevent wildfires". The main reason was to accurately expand the category beyond just forests to include wildlands, which include grasslands. Another reason was to respond to misplaced criticism from wildfire experts, and to distinguish 'bad' intentional or accidental wildfires from the needs of sustainable forests via natural 'good' fire ecology.

Decades of fire suppression and lack of indigenous fire ecology can contribute to dense forests with a lot of understory 'fuel' and many dead standing trees. When a forest fire eventually does occur, the increased fuel creates a crown fire, which destroys all vegetation and affects surface soil chemistry. Although such fires have been occurring sporadically for 100 million years, and are part of the natural ecological rhythm of forests, frequent and small 'natural' ground fires do prevent the accumulation of fuel and allow large, slow-growing vegetation (e.g. trees) to survive.

Periodic low-intensity wildfires are also an integral component of certain ecosystems that evolved to take advantage of natural fires, such as Douglas fir, chaparral and closed-cone pine forest habitats, which need fire for cones to open and seeds to sprout, and germinate and grow better in open burn sites. Wildfires also play a role in the preservation of pine barrens, which are well adapted to small ground fires and rely on periodic fires to remove competing species.

SmokeyBear.com's current site has a section on "Benefits of Fire" that includes this information: "Fire managers can reintroduce fire into fire-dependent ecosystems with prescribed fire. Under specific, controlled conditions, the beneficial effects of natural fire can be recreated, fuel buildup can be reduced, and we can prevent the catastrophic losses of uncontrolled, unwanted wildfire." Prescribed or controlled fire is an important resource management tool. It is a way to efficiently and safely provide for fire's natural role in the ecosystem. However, the goal of Smokey Bear will always be to reduce the number of human-caused wildfires and reduce the loss of resources, homes and lives.

See also
 Johnny Horizon
 Mark Trail
 Smokey the Bear Sutra
 Woodsy Owl

References

External links
 
 SmokeyBear.com
 A collection of Smokey Bear-related media 
 The Real Smokey Bear – slideshow by Life magazine
 Inventory of the Rudolph Wendelin Papers, 1930–2005 in the Forest History Society Library and Archives, Durham, NC
 
Smokey's Story, from the Texas Archive of the Moving Image
National Agricultural Library's Smokey Bear Collection – contains pictures, images, and a list of what's held in the collection.

Mascots introduced in 1944
Public service announcement characters
American mascots
Cartoon mascots
Anthropomorphic bears
Fictional park rangers
Fictional firefighters
Fire prevention
Public service announcements of the United States
United States Forest Service
Wildfire ecology
Bear mascots
Male characters in advertising
1976 animal deaths
National Zoological Park (United States)